The UK Albums Chart is one of many music charts compiled by the Official Charts Company that calculates the best-selling albums of the week in the United Kingdom. Since 2004 the chart has been based on the sales of both physical albums and digital downloads. This list shows albums that peaked in the Top 10 of the UK Albums Chart during 2008, as well as albums which peaked in 2007 and 2009 but were in the top 10 in 2008. The entry date is when the album appeared in the top 10 for the first time (week ending, as published by the Official Charts Company, which is six days after the chart is announced).

One-hundred and fifty-eight albums were in the top ten this year. Two albums from 2006 and sixteen albums from 2007 remained in the top 10 for several weeks at the beginning of the year, while I Am... Sasha Fierce by Beyoncé was released in 2008 but did not reach its peak until 2009. Back to Black: Deluxe Edition by Amy Winehouse, Raising Sand by Robert Plant & Alison Krauss and This Is the Life by Amy Macdonald 
were the albums from 2007 to reach their peak in 2008. Six artists scored multiple entries in the top 10 in 2008. Adele, Chris Brown, Miley Cyrus, OneRepublic and Scouting for Girls were among the many artists who achieved their first UK charting top 10 album in 2008.

The 2007 Christmas number-one album, Spirit, remained at the top spot for the first week of 2008. The first new number-one album of the year was In Rainbows by Radiohead. Overall, thirty-three different albums peaked at number-one in 2008, with thirty-three unique artists hitting that position.

Background

Multiple entries
One-hundred and fifty-eight albums charted in the top 10 in 2008, with one-hundred and forty-two albums reaching their peak this year (including Gold: Greatest Hits, Piano Man: The Very Best of Billy Joel and The Best of Neil Diamond, which charted in previous years but reached a peak on their latest chart run).

Six artists scored multiple entries in the top 10 in 2008. Amy Winehouse, Michael Jackson, Neil Diamond, Nickelback, Radiohead and Take That were the acts who had two top 10 albums this year. Michael Jackson, Nickelback and Radiohead's two entries were both released this year, with The Best of Neil Diamond by Neil Diamond returning after missing the top 10 when it was first released in 1998 and later in 2006.

Chart debuts
Forty-eight artists achieved their first top 10 album in 2008 as a lead artist.

The following table (collapsed on desktop site) does not include acts who had previously charted as part of a group and secured their first top 10 solo album, or featured appearances on compilations or other artists recordings.

Notes
Jonathan Ansell stepped away from his group G4 - who finished second on the second series of The X Factor and recorded two top 10 albums including a number-one - to record his debut top 10 solo album Tenor at the Movies. Sharleen Spiteri had a highly successful career to date as a member of the Scottish band Texas. Her debut album as a solo artist, Melody, reached number three.

Damon Albarn of Gorillaz and Blur recorded the soundtrack to the stage adaption of Chinese novel Journey to the West under the name Monkey. The album also featured the UK Chinese Ensemble making their album chart debut.

Queen + Paul Rodgers was a collaboration between Brian May and Roger Taylor from Queen, and Paul Rodgers, who had been part of numerous bands including Free and The Firm. The Cosmos Rocks was their first and only charting album as a supergroup.

Best-selling albums
Duffy had the best-selling album of the year with Rockferry. The album spent 42 weeks in the top 10 (including five weeks at number one), sold almost 1.685 million copies and was certified 6× platinum by the BPI. The Circus by Take That came in second place. Kings of Leon's Only by the Night, Spirit from Leona Lewis and Viva la Vida or Death and All His Friends by Coldplay made up the top five. Albums by Rihanna, The Killers, Girls Aloud, Pink and Scouting for Girls were also in the top ten best-selling albums of the year.

Top-ten albums
Key

Entries by artist
The following table shows artists who achieved two or more top 10 entries in 2008, including albums that reached their peak in 2007 or 2009. The figures only include main artists, with featured artists and appearances on compilation albums not counted individually for each artist. The total number of weeks an artist spent in the top ten in 2008 is also shown.

Notes

 Life in Cartoon Motion re-entered the top 10 at number 9 on 5 January 2008 (week ending) for 5 weeks and at number 9 on 23 February 2008 (week ending) for 4 weeks.
 Shock Value re-entered the top 10 at number 10 on 12 January 2008 (week ending).
 Version re-entered the top 10 at number 4 on 1 March 2008 (week ending) for 4 weeks.
 Call Me Irresponsible has two separate entries in the UK Albums Chart, one as a standard edition, and one as a special edition. Combining both editions, the album spent 12 non-consecutive weeks in the UK top 10 altogether. The special edition entered the top 10 at number 3 on 22 December 2007 (week ending), re-entered at number 6 on 23 February 2008 (week ending) and re-entered at number 4 on 8 March 2008 (week ending).
 Good Girl Gone Bad re-entered the top 10 at number 9 on 26 January 2008 (week ending) for 4 weeks, at number 10 on 1 March 2008 (week ending), at number 10 on 28 June 2008 (week ending), at number 9 on 12 July 2008 (week ending) for 2 weeks, at number 9 on 16 August 2008 (week ending) for 3 weeks and at number 5 on 13 September 2008 (week ending) for 7 weeks.
 This Is the Life re-entered the top 10 at number 6 on 12 January 2008 (week ending) for 7 weeks and at number 10 on 15 March 2008 (week ending) for 2 weeks.
 Hand Built by Robots re-entered the top 10 at number 7 on 19 January 2008 (week ending) for 4 weeks.
 All the Lost Souls re-entered the top 10 at number 8 on 12 April 2008 (week ending).
 The Trick to Life re-entered the top 10 at number 8 on 12 January 2008 (week ending) and at number 8 on 26 January 2008 (week ending) for 3 weeks.
 Raising Sand re-entered the top 10 at number 6 on 19 January 2008 (week ending) for 5 weeks.
 Spirit re-entered the top 10 at number 4 on 22 March 2008 (week ending) for 8 weeks and at number-one on 29 November 2008 (week ending) for 9 weeks.
 Call Me Irresponsible: Special Edition re-entered the top 10 at number 6 on 23 February 2008 (week ending) and at number 4 on 8 March 2008 (week ending).
 Scouting for Girls re-entered the top 10 at number 8 on 19 April 2008 (week ending) for 7 weeks and at number 10 on 30 August 2008 (week ending).
 All the Right Reasons re-entered the top 10 at number 8 on 19 July 2008 (week ending) for 5 weeks.
 19 re-entered the top 10 at number 8 on 3 May 2008 (week ending).
 His Wondrous Story – The Complete Collection re-entered the top 10 at number 10 on 8 March 2008 (week ending).
 Thriller 25 re-entered the top 10 at number 9 on 22 April 2008 (week ending) and at number 9 on 18 July 2009 (week ending).
 Back to Black: Deluxe Edition re-entered the top 10 at number 3 on 1 March 2008 (week ending) for 8 weeks, at number 10 on 8 May 2008 (week ending) and at number 7 on 12 July 2008 (week ending) for 2 weeks.
 Rockferry re-entered the top 10 at number 10 on 27 December 2008 (week ending) for 6 weeks and at number 4 on 28 February 2009 (week ending) for 3 weeks.
 The Seldom Seen Kid re-entered the top 10 at number 7 on 20 September 2008 (week ending) for 3 weeks, at number 6 on 14 February 2009 (week ending) and at number 5 on 28 February 2009 (week ending) for 3 weeks.
 Hard Candy re-entered the top 10 at number 10 on 26 July 2008 (week ending).
 Lessons to Be Learned re-entered the top 10 at number 8 on 24 May 2008 (week ending).
 Jumping All Over the World re-entered the top 10 at number 8 on 5 July 2008 (week ending).
 We Started Nothing re-entered the top 10 at number 6 on 12 July 2008 (week ending) for 7 weeks, at number 9 on 17 January 2009 (week ending) and at number 8 on 28 February 2009 (week ending) for 3 weeks.
 The Best of Neil Diamond originally peaked outside the top 10 at number 68 upon its initial release in 1996. It charted again at a new peak of number 30 in 2006 before reaching the top ten in 2008. 
 The Best of Neil Diamond re-entered the top 10 at number 10 on 12 July 2008 (week ending).
 Chant – Music for Paradise re-entered the top 10 at number 10 on 21 June 2008 (week ending).
 Gold: Greatest Hits originally peaked at number-one upon its initial release in 1992. It returned to the chart on many further occasions, including five more weeks at the top spot in 1999.
 Piano Man: The Very Best of Billy Joel originally peaked outside the top 10 at number 40 upon its initial release in 2004. It reached a new peak of number 11 in 2006.
 The Script re-entered the top 10 at number 8 on 10 January 2009 (week ending) for 6 weeks.
 Journey to the West was the soundtrack to the stage musical Monkey: Journey to the West. It was credited to Monkey and performed by Damon Albarn and the UK Chinese Ensemble.
 King of Pop re-entered the top 10 at number 5 on 11 July 2009 (week ending) after the death of Michael Jackson.
 Only By the Night re-entered the top 10 at number 6 on 27 June 2009 (week ending) for 2 weeks and at number 4 on 12 September 2009 (week ending) for 4 weeks.
 The Best Bette re-entered the top 10 at number 6 on 21 February 2009 (week ending) and at number 9 on 28 March 2009 (week ending).
 Songs for You, Truths for Me re-entered the top 10 at number 7 on 17 January 2009 (week ending) for 6 weeks, at number 9 on 11 April 2009 (week ending), at number 9 on 25 April 2009 (week ending) and at number 9 on 5 September 2009 (week ending) for 2 weeks.
 I Started Out with Nothin and I Still Got Most of It Left re-entered the top 10 at number 9 on 28 February 2009 (week ending).
 Funhouse re-entered the top 10 at number 10 on 3 January 2009 (week ending) and at number 10 on 2 May 2009 (week ending) for 6 weeks.
 The Promise re-entered the top 10 at number 5 on 20 December 2008 (week ending) for 3 weeks.
 I Am... Sasha Fierce re-entered the top 10 at number 9 on 27 December 2008 (week ending) for 8 weeks, at number 10 on 11 April 2009 (week ending) for 9 weeks and at number 5 on 15 August 2009 (week ending) for 4 weeks.
 Day & Age re-entered the top 10 at number 10 on 7 February 2009 (week ending) for 5 weeks.
 The Circus re-entered the top 10 at number 8 on 7 March 2009 (week ending) for 4 weeks and at number 4 on 4 July 2009 (week ending).
 Figure includes album that peaked in 2006.
 Figure includes album that peaked in 2007.
 Figure includes album that first charted in 2006 but peaked in 2007.
 Figure includes album that first charted in 2007 but peaked in 2008.

See also
2008 in British music
List of number-one albums from the 2000s (UK)

References
General

Specific

External links
2008 album chart archive at the Official Charts Company (click on relevant week)

United Kingdom top 10 albums
Top 10 albums
2007